Charles James Campbell (November 6, 1819 – April 17, 1906) was a Scottish-born merchant and political figure in Nova Scotia, Canada. He represented Victoria in the House of Commons of Canada from 1874 to 1875, from 1876 to 1878 and from 1882 to 1887 as a Conservative member.

He was born on the Isle of Skye, the son of John Campbell and Isabella McRae, and came to Nova Scotia in 1831. In 1843, Campbell married Eliza Jane Ingraham. He owned the New Campbellton Coal Mines. He was named a justice of the peace for Cape Breton County in 1851 and county coroner in 1857. Campbell was also lieutenant-colonel for the county militia, served as a chairman of the county board of health, was a school trustee and served on the province's board of agriculture.

Campbell represented Victoria County in the Nova Scotia House of Assembly from 1853 to 1859, from 1863 to 1867 and from 1871 to 1873. He was also elected to the provincial assembly in 1851 and 1860 but was unseated after those elections were appealed. He served as a member of the province's Executive Council from 1856 to 1859. In 1873, he was named to the province's Legislative Council and he served until 1874, when he was elected to the House of Commons. His election was subsequently overturned the following year. Campbell was an unsuccessful candidate for the House of Commons in 1873, 1875, 1878 and 1887.

Campbell died in North Sydney at the age of 86.

Electoral record

References 

1819 births
1906 deaths
Progressive Conservative Association of Nova Scotia MLAs
Members of the House of Commons of Canada from Nova Scotia
Conservative Party of Canada (1867–1942) MPs
Conservative Party of Nova Scotia MLCs
Candidates in the 1878 Canadian federal election
People from Baddeck, Nova Scotia
Canadian justices of the peace
Canadian coroners